The News-Times is a weekly newspaper covering the cities of Forest Grove and Hillsboro in the U.S. state of Oregon. Established in 1886 and with coverage focused on Forest Grove for most of its history, the paper only recently added equivalent coverage of the much larger city of Hillsboro, when, in August 2019, publisher Pamplin Media Group launched a separate Hillsboro edition of the News-Times, to replace Pamplin's Hillsboro Tribune. The paper is published on Wednesdays. As of 2014, it had a circulation of approximately 3,100. It is owned by Pamplin Media Group, which owns other community newspapers in the Portland metropolitan area.

History
The newspaper was established in 1886 as the Washington County News-Times. Over time the newspaper changed its name to the Forest Grove News-Times and became part of Community Newspapers Inc., which owned other Portland-area community papers. The paper took first place in its division for spot news coverage and enterprise reporting in 1999 from the Oregon Newspaper Publishers Association, and the following year took first for news photo and local column.

In August 2000, Community Newspapers was acquired by Pamplin Communications, passing ownership of the News-Times to Pamplin Media Group. The News-Times took home two more first-place prizes at the Better Newspaper Contest in 2001, but just one in 2002. In 2006, the newspaper had three first-place finishes at the Oregon Newspaper Publishers Association’s Better Newspaper Contest. The paper took first place for its division for educational coverage in 2007 from the Oregon Newspaper Publishers Association.

Pamplin Media Group launched the Hillsboro Tribune in nearby Hillsboro in September 2012, which then competed with The Hillsboro Argus. The Argus publisher then launched the Forest Grove Leader in October 2012. The News-Times publisher claimed the launch of the second Forest Grove newspaper was retaliation for starting the Hillsboro paper. The competition between the media companies was the focus of a "Think Out Loud" segment on Oregon Public Broadcasting in November 2012 featuring News-Times publisher John Schrag. The Argus and Leader were later merged into a single paper called the Washington County Argus, which ceased publication in 2017.

Schrag, a former Willamette Week editor, became the paper's editor in the mid-2000s, and the News-Times won several statewide awards for general excellence during his tenure. Nikki DeBuse became the News-Times publisher on February 1, 2016.

In August 2019, owner Pamplin Media announced that a new Hillsboro edition of the News-Times would be launched on August 14, replacing the Pamplin-owned Hillsboro Tribune, which had been in publication since 2012. The final newsprint edition under the Tribune name was published on August 7, 2019, and the first "Hillsboro Edition" of the News-Times was published on August 14, 2019. The two papers were already owned by the same company, and had been operating out of the same office in Forest Grove since the Tribunes inception.

Details
As of 2014, the paper had a circulation of 3,102 for its weekly run. Nikki DeBuse is the publisher and Mark Miller the editor of the newspaper, which is owned by Pamplin Media Group. The News-Times is published on Wednesdays.

References

External links
About Forest Grove News-Times. (Forest Grove, Or.) 1981-1985

1886 establishments in Oregon
Forest Grove, Oregon
Newspapers published by Pamplin Media Group
Oregon Newspaper Publishers Association
Publications established in 1886
Newspapers published in Oregon